Emanuele Brioschi (born 23 June 1975 in Milan) is an Italian football defender.

His professional career began in Serie A with Bari in the 1993–94 season, and he later played with Venezia (1998–2000) and Bologna (2000–2002) for a total of 107 matches. He scored three goals, all with Bologna.

References

External links

1975 births
Living people
Footballers from Milan
Italian footballers
Serie A players
Serie B players
S.S.C. Bari players
Venezia F.C. players
Bologna F.C. 1909 players
U.S. Cremonese players
Como 1907 players
A.S.D. SolbiaSommese Calcio players
Cosenza Calcio players
Association football defenders